V. Parmeswaran Nair is a physicist, currently a Distinguished Professor at City University of New York, holding it since September 2011, and is also a published author.

References

ORCID profile

Year of birth missing (living people)
Living people
20th-century Indian physicists
City University of New York faculty
American academics of Indian descent